Limits and Renewals is a short story collection published by Rudyard Kipling in 1932.

Contents
The collection contains the following short stories:

Dayspring Mishandled
The Woman in His Life
The Tie
The Church that was at Antioch
Aunt Ellen
Fairy-Kist
A Naval Mutiny
The Debt
Akbar's Bridge
The Manner of Men
Unprofessional
Beauty Spots
The Miracle of Saint Jubanus
The Tender Achilles
Uncovenanted Mercies

Additionally, several poems were published:
Gertrude's Prayer
Dinah in Heaven
Four-Feet
The Totem
The Disciple
The Playmate
Naaman's Song
The Mother's Son
The Coiner
At his Execution
The Threshold
Neighbours
The Expert
The Curé
Song of Seventy Horses
Hymn to Physical Pain
The Penalty
Azrael's Count

See also
 List of the works of Rudyard Kipling
 1932 in literature

References

Works by Rudyard Kipling
Short story collections by Rudyard Kipling